Amir Abdullah Khan Rokhri (10 June 1916 – 2 December 2001) was a politician and was actively involved in the Pakistan Movement.

Early life
Amir Abdullah Khan Rokhri belonged to the Niazi tribe in Rokhri, Mianwali District, Punjab, Pakistan. He was also known as Khan Sahib, a title given by the British to him which he abandoned this title in 1946 on the direction of Muhammad Ali Jinnah.

Activism
He became an active member of the Muslim Students Federation as a student and campaigned for the Pakistan Movement from the Mianwali District.

Career
In the Indian provincial elections, 1946, Amir Abdullah Khan Niazi of Rokhri was elected Member of Legislative Assembly (MLA).

After the independence of Pakistan in 1947, he became the first Chairman of the District Council of Mianwali from 1948 to 1958. He was also elected MPA in 1970 during the Pakistani general election, 1970. In the elections of 1977, Amir Abdullah Khan Rokhri was elected MNA defeating the candidate of the Pakistan National Alliance, Maulana Abdul Sattar Khan Niazi.

He served in the Senate of Pakistan from 1985 to 1991 and then was re-elected for another six year term until 1997. In the meantime his son, Aamir Hayat Khan Rokhri served as an MPA and MNA and his nephew, Gul Hameed Khan Rokhri also served as an MPA, MNA and Punjab Food Minister. Rokhri did not only succeed from Mianwali but also from Bhakkar. He was a close friend of Amir Mohammad Khan, Governor of West Pakistan. He was also an intimate friend of Chaudhry Zahoor Elahi and Ayub Khan (his son is married to Ayub's granddaughter). He remained one of the Pakistan Muslim League's loyal workers for a long time.

He was elected to the Legislative Assembly of Pakistani Punjab despite the opposition of figures such as Mian Mumtaz Daultana, Chief Minister of Punjab.

Amir Abdullah Khan Rokhri along with Balakh Sher Mazari, Anwar Ali Noon, Sikandar Hayat Khan, and Sardar Ahmad Ali resigned from the National Assembly when Zulfikar Ali Bhutto jailed their close friend, Chaudhry Zahoor Elahi. Amir Abdullah Khan Rokhri was a close friend of the Pir of Pagaro VII, Balakh Sher Mazari, Colonel Abid Hussain and others. The affection the people of Mianwali had for Amir Abdullah Khan Rokhri was obvious to anyone who attended his funeral. His death was condoled by leaders from every party whereas many leading politicians attended his funeral in his ancestral village of Rokhri including Chaudhry Shujaat Hussain, former Prime Minister, Gohar Ayub Khan, former Foreign Minister & Speaker of National Assembly of Pakistan, Syeda Abida Hussain, former Federal Minister, and others. Amir Abdullah Khan Rokhri's political influence was greatest in the district of Mianwali and Bhakkar.

Awards and honours
 Tehrik e Pakistan (Pakistan Movement) Award by the Governor of Punjab, Pakistan.

Family
He founded the New Khan Transport Company. New Khan Transport is the largest transport company in Pakistan. It introduced luxury air-conditioned buses to Pakistan.

He also wrote an autobiography Mein Aur Mera Pakistan, a book in Urdu-language which presents his personal account of the history of Pakistan.

He leaves behind a son and five daughters. His son Aamir Hayat Khan Rokhri was a MPA and his nephew Gul Hameed Khan Rokhri, is a former MPA, MNA and Punjab Revenue, Relief & Consolidations Minister.

References

External links
 Amir Abdullah Khan Rokri – Senate of Pakistan

Pakistani politicians
Pakistan Movement activists
All India Muslim League members
Members of the Provincial Assembly of the Punjab
Members of the Senate of Pakistan
Amir
1916 births
2001 deaths
Pashtun people
People from Mianwali District